Miconia lacera is a species of shrub in the family Melastomataceae. It is native to North and South America.

References

lacera
Flora of Peru
Flora of Ecuador
Flora of Mexico
Flora of Panama
Flora of Colombia
Flora of Venezuela
Flora of Nicaragua
Taxa named by Aimé Bonpland